

253001–253100 

|-bgcolor=#f2f2f2
| colspan=4 align=center | 
|}

253101–253200 

|-bgcolor=#f2f2f2
| colspan=4 align=center | 
|}

253201–253300 

|-bgcolor=#f2f2f2
| colspan=4 align=center | 
|}

253301–253400 

|-bgcolor=#f2f2f2
| colspan=4 align=center | 
|}

253401–253500 

|-id=412
| 253412 Ráskaylea ||  || Lea Ráskay, a 16th-century Hungarian nun and scholar. She was a member of the Dominican monastery on Margaret Island, Budapest. || 
|}

253501–253600 

|-id=536
| 253536 Tymchenko ||  || Mykhajlo Todosovych Tymchenko (1943–2013), a sports coach and longtime physical education teacher at the  gymnasium of Andrushivka, Ukraine || 
|-id=587
| 253587 Cloutier ||  || Bill Cloutier (born 1955), amateur astronomer and community educator, is current Chairman of the McCarthy Observatory Board of Directors and a founder of the facility. A proponent of science literacy and educational excellence, he has observed this minor planet. || 
|}

253601–253700 

|-bgcolor=#f2f2f2
| colspan=4 align=center | 
|}

253701–253800 

|-bgcolor=#f2f2f2
| colspan=4 align=center | 
|}

253801–253900 

|-bgcolor=#f2f2f2
| colspan=4 align=center | 
|}

253901–254000 

|-bgcolor=#f2f2f2
| colspan=4 align=center | 
|}

References 

253001-254000